This is a list of hospitals for human medical treatment in Panama, in alphabetical order and categorized by province.

Colón
 Hospital Manuel Amador Guerrero, social security hospital.

Chiriquí
 Hospital Centro Médico Mae Lewis — David.
 Hospital Chiriquí — David.
 Hospital Materno Infantil Jose Domingo de Obaldía — David, a public pediatric hospital .
 Hospital Régional de Chiriqui

Herrera
 Hospital Cecilio A. Castillero — Chitre, major public hospital.
 Hospital El Vigia — Chitre, a social security hospital.

Los Santos
 Hospital Dr. Joaquin Franco — Las Tablas.

Panamá

 Centro Médico Paitilla — Panama City.
 Clínica Hospital San Fernando — Panama City, a full-service private hospital.
 Complejo Hospitalario Metropolitano Arnulfo Arias Madrid — Panama City, main social security hospital.
 Hospital de Especialidades Pediátricas — Panama City, a social security pediatric hospital.
 Hospital del Niño (English: Children's Hospital) — Panama City, the largest pediatric hospital in the country.
 Hospital Integrado San Miguel Arcángel — San Miguelito, a mixed public and social security hospital.
 Hospital Nacional — Panama City, a full-service private hospital.
 Hospital Nicolás A. Solano — La Chorrera.
 Hospital Psiquiátrico Nacional — Panama City, the major psychiatric institution.
 Hospital Punta Pacifica, a full-service private hospital.
 Hospital Santa Fe — Panama City.
 Hospital Santo Tomas — Panama City, the largest public hospital in the country.
 Hospital Susana Jones — Panama City.
 Instituto Oncológico Nacional — Panama City, a specialized hospital for cancer treatment.

Veraguas
 Hospital Regional de Veraguas Dr. Luis Fábrega — Santiago de Veraguas.

External links
Clickable Country Map with Photos of All Social Security Hospitals (dead link: see archived page)

 
Hospitals
P
Panama